Sumatraism is an avant-garde art movement created by Serbian writer Miloš Crnjanski. Crnjanski had set the principles of Sumatraism during World War I, and proclaimed it in his 1920 text Explanation of Sumatra.

Crnjanski based Sumatraism under the influence of Expressionism and Futurism, introducing his vision of cosmic harmony. His concept included the most important topics of contemporary avant-garde art: primal force, the conflict between civilization and nature, and the hope for a new beginning.

External links

References 

Serbian literature
Serbian poetry
Art movements
Avant-garde art
Modern art
Modernism
Serbian art movements